Francesco Paolo Bonifacio (3 May 1923 in Castellammare di Stabia – 14 March 1989 in Rome) was an Italian politician, jurist and academic. He served as Minister of Justice and President of the Constitutional Court of Italy.

Biography
Bonifacio was born in Castellammare di Stabia, near Naples.

He was one of the youngest full professors of Roman Law at the University of Cagliari, Bari and Naples, a position he held until February 1963, when he was elected by the Italian Parliament as a judge of the Italian Constitutional Court. He was then elected as the eighth President of such Court from February 1973 to October 1975. 

In 1964 Bonifacio was awarded Italy's highest honor: the Republic's Grand Cross Knighthood (Cavaliere di Gran Croce della Repubblica).

In 1975 Bonifacio was elected to the Italian Senate, and served as Minister of Justice from February 1976 until March 1979. Bonifacio presided over two Senate commissions which considered and promoted constitutional amendments.  

From 1987 he began to teach Constitutional Justice at the Sapienza University of Rome.

He died in 1989 in his home in Rome, due to a tumor.

References

1923 births
1989 deaths
People from Castellammare di Stabia
20th-century Italian jurists
Italian jurists
Italian Ministers of Justice
Academic staff of the University of Naples Federico II
Academic staff of the Sapienza University of Rome
Members of the Senate of the Republic (Italy)
Judges of the Constitutional Court of Italy
Presidents of the Constitutional Court of Italy
20th-century Italian judges
20th-century Italian politicians
20th-century jurists